Jairus Lyles (born July 6, 1995) is an American former professional basketball player. He played college basketball for the UMBC Retrievers. He also competed for the VCU Rams in his freshman season but played a limited role before transferring. Prior to college, Lyles attended DeMatha Catholic High School in Hyattsville, Maryland, where he was a three-star recruit. At UMBC, he earned all-conference honors for three consecutive years. He most notably led the Retrievers to a first-round victory over Virginia at the 2018 NCAA tournament, the first time a 16-seed defeated a 1-seed in men's tournament history.

Early life
Lyles was born in Silver Spring, Maryland to Lester Lyles and Carol Motley. His father Lester was a four-year football player for the Virginia Cavaliers, for whom he won the 1984 Peach Bowl, before spending seven seasons in the National Football League (NFL). His mother Carol attended the University of Virginia as well. In addition, Lyles' sister Symone played four seasons of basketball for the Ohio Bobcats. His parents later divorced, and Jairus was mainly raised by his mother.

High school career
Lyles attended DeMatha Catholic High School in Hyattsville, Maryland, where he was a combo guard. As a freshman, he was teammates with future NBA All-Star player Victor Oladipo. In his junior season, he averaged 11 points and three assists per game and helped his team reach the Washington Catholic Athletic Conference (WCAC) finals. As a senior, he averaged 13.4 points and 4.3 assists per game but his team finished with a 14–17 record, one of the worst seasons in program history. Lyles also played for Team Takeover on the Amateur Athletic Union (AAU) circuit, competing alongside Josh Hart. Lyles was rated a consensus three-star recruit and chose to play for VCU in college despite drawing interest from Oklahoma State, who gave him an offer, as well as Penn State and Virginia Tech.

College career

Lyles competed for the VCU Rams as a freshman in 2013–14 under head coach Shaka Smart, averaging 0.7 points, 0.2 rebounds, and 0.3 assists in only 2.9 minutes per game. He only recorded two field goals in the season, scoring a season-high three points on two occasions, against Fordham and Rhode Island. Following the season, he transferred to play for the Robert Morris Colonials but was forced to sit out in 2014–15 due to eligibility rules. After one semester at Robert Morris, Lyles transferred to the University of Maryland, Baltimore County (UMBC), where he would play for the Retrievers starting in the 2015–16 season. He made an instant impact as a sophomore for UMBC, averaging 23.0 points, 5.5 rebounds, and 2.8 assists per game and garnering second-team All-America East Conference accolades. In his junior season, Lyles averaged 18.9 points, 6.6 rebounds, and 2.6 assists en route to second-team All-America East honors. He scored a total of 604 points, breaking the school record for most points by a junior.

Lyles made his senior debut on November 10, 2017, in a loss to SMU, scoring 24 points with five assists for UMBC. In his next game, he recorded 31 points, five rebounds, four assists, and three steals in a defeat to Arizona. On November 19, Lyles had a double-double of 26 points and 11 rebounds against Colgate. He scored a season-best 35 points to help UMBC beat Hartford on January 15, 2018. By the end of his regular season campaign, Lyles was named first-team All-America East. On March 10, in the championship game of the 2018 America East tournament vs. Vermont, Lyles scored 27 points, including a game-winning three-pointer with 0.5 seconds left in regulation. He was named most outstanding player (MOP) of the tournament. On March 16, at the first round of the 2018 NCAA Division I men's basketball tournament, Lyles notched a game-high 28 points, shooting 9-of-11 from the field, to lead UMBC to a 20-point upset over top-seeded Virginia. The game marked the first time in tournament history that a 16-seed defeated a 1-seed. After his performance, Lyles drew national attention, being featured in stories by The Washington Post and USA Today.

Professional career
Lyles went undrafted in the 2018 NBA draft but subsequently joined the Utah Jazz for the NBA Summer League. He was the first Retriever to play in the NBA Summer League. On July 12, 2018, he signed with the Utah Jazz. After appearing in five preseason games, Lyles was waived on October 14. The Jazz added Lyles to their NBA G League affiliate, the Salt Lake City Stars.

On July 25, 2019, Lyles signed with MHP Riesen Ludwigsburg of the Basketball Bundesliga.
On December 15, 2019, he signed with Löwen Braunschweig of the German Basketball Bundesliga (BBL). Lyles signed with Krka of the Slovenian League and ABA League Second Division on July 14, 2020. However, he never played for the team.

Career statistics

College

|-
| style="text-align:left;"| 2013–14
| style="text-align:left;"| VCU
|| 22 || 0 || 2.6 || .100 || .125 || .667 || .2 || .2 || .2 || .0 || .6
|-
| style="text-align:left;"| 2015–16 
| style="text-align:left;"| UMBC
|| 21 || 19 || 36.2 || .472 || .342 || .698 || 5.5 || 2.8 || 2.5 || .0 || 23.0
|-
| style="text-align:left;"| 2016–17 
| style="text-align:left;"| UMBC 
|| 32 || 31 || 34.6 || .442 || .319 || .728 || 6.6 || 2.6 || 1.7 || .0 || 18.9
|-
| style="text-align:left;"| 2017–18
| style="text-align:left;"| UMBC
|| 33 || 32 || 34.9 || .439 || .390 || .792 || 5.5 || 3.5 || 2.1 || .2 || 20.2
|- class="sortbottom"
| style="text-align:center;" colspan="2"| Career
|| 108 || 82 || 28.5 || .444 || .352 || .739 || 4.8 || 2.4 || 1.7 || .1 || 16.3

See also
2018 UMBC vs. Virginia men's basketball game

References

External links
 VCU Rams bio
 UMBC Retrievers bio

1995 births
Living people
American expatriate basketball people in Germany
American men's basketball players
Basketball Löwen Braunschweig players
Basketball players from Maryland
DeMatha Catholic High School alumni
People from Silver Spring, Maryland
Point guards
Riesen Ludwigsburg players
Salt Lake City Stars players
Shooting guards
UMBC Retrievers men's basketball players
VCU Rams men's basketball players